Andromma is a genus of spiders in the family Liocranidae. It was first described in 1893 by Eugène Simon.

Species 
 it contains twenty-three species:

 Andromma aethiopicum Simon, 1893 — Ethiopia
 Andromma albinovani Bosselaers & Jocqué, 2022 — Ivory Coast
 Andromma alvoculatum Bosselaers & Jocqué, 2022 — DR Congo
 Andromma anacardium Bosselaers & Jocqué, 2022 — Ethiopia
 Andromma anochetorum Simon, 1909 — Gabon
 Andromma bouvieri Fage, 1936 — Kenya
 Andromma cyamos Bosselaers & Jocqué, 2022 — DR Congo
 Andromma cycnotrachelos Bosselaers & Jocqué, 2022 — DR Congo
 Andromma delphiurum Bosselaers & Jocqué, 2022 — Nigeria
 Andromma deogratias Bosselaers & Jocqué, 2022 — Burundi
 Andromma dicranobelos Bosselaers & Jocqué, 2022 — DR Congo
 Andromma didrepanum Bosselaers & Jocqué, 2022 — DR Congo
 Andromma divinagraciae Bosselaers & Jocqué, 2022 — Burundi
 Andromma elephantactes Bosselaers & Jocqué, 2022 — Ivory Coast
 Andromma ghesquierei Bosselaers & Jocqué, 2022 — DR Congo
 Andromma heligmos Bosselaers & Jocqué, 2022 — DR Congo
 Andromma helix Bosselaers & Jocqué, 2022 — Ivory Coast
 Andromma juakalyi Bosselaers & Jocqué, 2022 — DR Congo
 Andromma katangense Bosselaers & Jocqué, 2022 — DR Congo
 Andromma ophiophagum Bosselaers & Jocqué, 2022 — DR Congo, Burundi
 Andromma prosopion Bosselaers & Jocqué, 2022 — Cameroon
 Andromma raffrayi Simon, 1899 — Namibia, Mozambique, South Africa
 Andromma velum Bosselaers & Jocqué, 2022 — Malawi

References

Liocranidae
Araneomorphae genera
Spiders of Africa